Mateo Inurria Lainosa (25 March 1867, Córdoba - 21 February 1924, Madrid) was a Spanish sculptor.

Biography
His began his artistic studies in his father's workshop. Until 1883, he attended the "Escuela Provincial de Bellas Artes" under Rafael Romero Barros. From 1883 to 1885, he studied at the "Escuela Especial de Pintura, Escultura y Grabado" in Madrid.

His academic achievements were noted by members of the "Diputación Provincial de Córdoba" (the regional government) who granted him a scholarship so he could continue his studies at the Real Academia de Bellas Artes de San Fernando until 1890, when he had his first showing at the National Exhibition of Fine Arts with "The Castaway", which was done so realistically that some jurors suspected it of having been cast from life.

Between 1891 and 1901, he lived in the countryside, oblivious to critics and the public, becoming established as a teacher and art restorer. His many projects included the Mosque–Cathedral of Córdoba and the Medina Azahara. During these years, his work took on greater simplicity and he always spoke of himself as having been self-taught. He produced mostly religious and commemorative sculptures, in Córdoba and Madrid, receiving many commissions to create monuments for local and national celebrities, many of which were not erected. Eventually, he became a Professor of modelling and figure drawing at the "Escuela Municipal de Artes y Oficios" (Arts & Crafts) in  Córdoba and, in 1901, was appointed Director. From 1905, he was occasionally a member of the jury at the National Exhibition.

In 1911, he was named Professor of modelling and casting at the "Escuela de Artes y Oficios" in  Madrid. Now that he was in the capital, he was able to make more connections to promote his work and he concentrated on his preferred theme; idealizing the nude female form. He obtained the Gold Medal at the National Exhibition in 1920 and, two years later, became an Academician at the Real Academia de Bellas Artes de San Fernando. He died suddenly in 1924. An art school and a major street in Córdoba have been named after him.

Public monuments 

 Monument to Lope de Vega, 1902, Madrid.
 Group representing the Spanish Navy for the Monument to Alfonso XII, 1905, Madrid.
 Monument to Eduardo Rosales, 1922, Madrid.
 Monument to the "Gran Capitán" (Gonzalo Fernández de Córdoba), 1923, Córdoba.

References

Further reading
 Bernardino de Pantorba, El escultor Mateo Inurria. Ensayo biográfico crítico, Córdoba, Monte de Piedad y Caja de Ahorros, 1968.

External links

 "The Castaway" @ Panoramio
 "Monument to Eduardo Rosales" @ Panoramio
 Escuela de Artes y Oficios Mateo Inurria @ Córdobapedia

1867 births
1924 deaths
People from Córdoba, Spain
20th-century Spanish sculptors
20th-century Spanish male artists
Spanish male sculptors
19th-century sculptors
Real Academia de Bellas Artes de San Fernando alumni